Samurai Samba is the third album of the American jazz group Yellowjackets, released in 1985. The album reached a peak position of number 179 on the Billboard 200 and number 10 on Billboard Jazz Albums chart.

Track listing

Personnel 

Yellowjackets
 Russell Ferrante – keyboards
 Jimmy Haslip – 5-string bass
 Ricky Lawson – acoustic drums, Simmons drums
 Marc Russo – alto saxophone

Additional musicians
 Rory Kaplan – Fairlight CMI programming
 Michael Landau – guitar
  Carlos Rios – guitar
 Paulinho da Costa – percussion, vocals, lead vocals (7, listed as Paulo da Costa Jr.)
 Marilyn Scott – vocals
 Carl Caldwell – vocals
 Bobby Caldwell – lead vocals (6)

Production 
 Yellowjackets – producers 
 Tommy LiPuma – producer 
 Erik Zobler – engineer, mixing 
 Terry Christian – second engineer
 Toni Greene – second engineer
 Jon Ingoldsby – second engineer
 Peggy McCreary – second engineer
 Casey McMackin – second engineer
 Steve Shelton – second engineer
 Gary Wagner – second engineer
 Simon Levy – art direction, design
 Lou Beach – cover artwork
 Jeff Katz – photography

Studios
 Recorded at Larrabee Sound Studios (North Hollywood, CA); Sunset Sound and Music Grinder Studios (Hollywood, CA); Mad Hatter Studios (Los Angeles, CA).
 Mixed at Sunset Sound

Charts

References

Yellowjackets albums
1985 albums
Warner Records albums
Instrumental albums
Albums produced by Tommy LiPuma